(in English: Intellectuals for Sovereignty), or IPSO, is a group of intellectuals studying and promoting Quebec independence.

It was created on June 21, 1995 by the publication of their manifesto, four months before the second referendum on Quebec sovereignty took place. Among its founding members were politician and constitutional law professor Daniel Turp, Michel Seymour, Jacques-Yvan Morin, Kai Nielsen and others.

IPSO promotes Quebec sovereignty through the publication of works, organization of events (debates, conferences, protests) and participation in political activities. It was part of the Partenaires pour la souveraineté coalition.

Presidents 
Three men and four women, all university professors, have held the IPSO presidency since its foundation:

Since 2008, IPSO is presided by Gilbert Paquette, former Quebec Minister of Science and Technology in the government of René Lévesque.

See also 
Quebec sovereignty movement
Quebec nationalism
Quebec politics
List of active autonomist and secessionist movements

Notes

External links
Official website
List of publications
Les Intellectuels pour la souveraineté (I) - Canadian Political Parties and Political Interest Groups - Web Archive created by the University of Toronto Libraries
 Les Intellectuels pour la souveraineté (II)- Canadian Political Parties and Political Interest Groups - Web Archive created by the University of Toronto Libraries
 Les Intellectuels pour la souveraineté (III)- Canadian Political Parties and Political Interest Groups - Web Archive created by the University of Toronto Libraries

Civic and political organizations of Canada
Quebec sovereignty movement
Secessionist organizations in Canada
Organizations based in Montreal